Hard 2 Love is the eighth full-length album released by Haystak on August 26, 2008. Easy 2 Hate was released on November 30, 2010 as a sequel to Hard 2 Love. This album peaked on the Billboard 200 R&B/Hip-Hop Albums at 28, 13 on the Heatseekers Albums, 41 on the Independent Albums, and 15 on the Rap Albums.

Track listing
 "The White Boys Back" - 4:27
 "Say Sump'n" - 3:33
 "My Space" - 4:08
 "Plottin' On A Bakery" - 3:52
 "Titanic" - 4:46
 "B.O.S.S (Boy Observe Somethin' Serious" - 4:01
 "Not The One" - 3:49
 "Blastville" - 4:36
 "South Side" - 4:29
 "R.I.P Pimp C" - 4:51
 "For The Rats" - 4:38
 "Hard 2 Love" - 5:05
 "Comin' With Me" - 4:28
 "You Go Do You" - 4:27
 "Boss Man" - 4:29  Produced by Mr.Giggles
 "I Do It For You" - 4:32

References 

Haystak albums
2008 albums